The Honduras national football team represents Honduras in men's international football. The team is governed by the Federación Nacional Autónoma de Fútbol de Honduras (FENAFUTH). They are nicknamed Los Catrachos, La Bicolor, or La H.

Honduras has qualified for the World Cup three times, in 1982, 2010, and 2014, and never advanced beyond the group stage. Outside of the FIFA World Cup tournament, Honduras has competed in several other international competitions, like the CONCACAF Championship tournament (which they won in 1981), and the Copa América (which their best result was third place in 2001). Apart from that, Honduras has also won the Central American Cup championship four times, having won the final edition in 2017.

History
The national team made its debut in the Independence Centenary Games held in Guatemala City in September 1921, losing 9–0 to Guatemala.

During their first appearance at the Central American and Caribbean Games in 1930, Honduras posted a record of two wins and three losses. Their only wins came against Jamaica (5–1) and El Salvador (4–1), while they lost two games to Cuba and Costa Rica.

The national association, the National Autonomous Federation of Football of Honduras (FENAFUTH) was founded in 1935. It joined FIFA in 1946 and co-founded CONCACAF in 1961.

1970 World Cup and the Football War
Prior to the qualification stages leading up to the 1970 World Cup in Mexico, Honduras and El Salvador found themselves in what was called the Football War. This nickname was given to the situation after a play-off game was played between the two countries to decide which would qualify for the Finals. This political crisis eventually turned into a war that lasted approximately 100 hours.

Honduras had begun qualifying by defeating Costa Rica and Jamaica. Against Jamaica, they easily won both games, 5–1 on aggregate. They beat Costa Rica 1–0 in Tegucigalpa and drew 1–1 away. This set up a final match between Honduras and El Salvador, who had eliminated Guyana and the Netherlands Antilles.

In the first game against El Salvador, Honduras won 1–0 in Tegucigalpa on 8 June 1969. Honduras were coached by Carlos Padilla Velásquez and the only goal of the game was scored by Leonard Welch. Honduras lost the second game 3–0 in San Salvador, and a play-off was required in the Azteca Stadium in Mexico City on 27 June. El Salvador won 3–2 to qualify and eliminate Honduras.

1982 World Cup

Honduras won the 1981 CONCACAF Championship and qualified for the World Cup for the first time in 1982. Despite drawing against the hosts Spain and Northern Ireland, both 1–1, they were eliminated in the first round after losing their last match to Yugoslavia 1–0.

Honduras finished second in the 1985 CONCACAF Championship, losing their final match 2–1 against Canada, who went on to qualify for the 1986 World Cup. Their next major accomplishment was being runners-up at the 1991 CONCACAF Gold Cup, losing against the host nation, the United States.

For the 1998 World Cup, Jamaica and Mexico eliminated Honduras at the third round stage. Despite Honduras's overwhelming 11–3 victory against Saint Vincent & the Grenadines, Jamaica defeated Mexico at Independence Park, Kingston, allowing the Reggae Boys to advance to the next round.

2001 Copa América

Since 1993, CONMEBOL has invited teams from other confederations to participate in their confederation championship, the Copa América. Honduras took part as one of the last-minute teams added for the 2001 tournament, as Argentina dropped out one day before the start. The team arrived only a few hours before the tournament's first game and with barely enough players. Despite the odds, Honduras progressed into the quarter-finals, where they defeated Brazil 2–0. In the semi-finals, Colombia knocked out Honduras 2–0.

Honduras advanced to the final round in the qualifying competition for the 2002 FIFA World Cup, but again failed to qualify after losing at home to Trinidad & Tobago, and away against Mexico in their final two matches. The match against Trinidad and Tobago saw Honduras hit the goal post seven times.

2010 World Cup

On 14 October 2009, Honduras qualified for the 2010 World Cup after a 1–0 win against El Salvador gave them the third automatic qualifying spot from the Fourth Round of CONCACAF Qualifying.

Honduras faced Chile, Spain, and Switzerland in their first round group. In their first match they lost to Chile 1–0, to a goal from Jean Beausejour. They then lost 2–0 to Spain, with both goals scored by David Villa. In their last match they drew 0–0 against Switzerland and were eliminated in last place in the group.

2014 World Cup

In the qualifying competition for the 2014 World Cup, Honduras were given a bye to the third round because of their third-place position among CONCACAF teams in the March 2011 FIFA World Rankings. They qualified for the final round by finishing first in their group, which included Panama, Canada and Cuba. After beginning with a home defeat against Panama, Honduras recovered and beat Canada 8–1 in their final match, allowing them to win the group ahead of Panama.

In the final round of qualifying, the Hexagonal, six teams faced each other in a home-and-away format. In their first two games, Honduras defeated the United States 2–1 and came back from a two-goal deficit to draw 2–2 with Mexico. They lost three of their next four matches before travelling to Mexico City to face Mexico in the Azteca. Honduras again trailed but scored twice in the second half for a stunning 2–1 win. They returned to Tegucigalpa, where they drew 2–2 against Panama, who escaped defeat with a last-minute goal by Roberto Chen. In the final two games, Honduras beat Costa Rica 1–0 at home and qualified with a 2–2 draw against Jamaica in Kingston.

In the Finals in Brazil, Honduras again finished bottom of their first round group, after 3–0 defeats against France and Switzerland, and a 2–1 defeat to Ecuador. The match against France featured the first use of goal-line technology to award a goal at the World Cup: an own-goal by Honduras's goalkeeper, Noel Valladares. Against Ecuador, Carlo Costly scored Honduras's first goal in the Finals for 32 years.

Decline

Honduras failed to qualify for the 2018 World Cup. In the Hexagonal stage they dropped into fourth place after Panama scored an 88th-minute winning goal in their last match against Costa Rica. Honduras had themselves dropped points by conceding late goals in their two previous games, against Costa Rica and the United States. They entered a play-off against Australia, and after a 0–0 draw at home, Honduras were eliminated when they lost the second leg in Sydney 3–1.

In the 2022 FIFA World Cup qualification – CONCACAF Third Round, Honduras did considerably worse, with the Hondurans, for the first time ever in a World Cup qualification, failed to register a single win, with just four draws.

Honduras have won the UNCAF Nations Cup four times: in 1993, 1995, 2011 and 2017.

Home stadium

Honduras plays the majority of its home games at Estadio Olímpico Metropolitano in San Pedro Sula.

The national team also plays at Estadio Nacional Chelato Uclés in Tegucigalpa. In the past, Honduras played their games in San Pedro Sula at Estadio Francisco Morazán.

Estadio Nilmo Edwards in La Ceiba has also hosted friendly exhibition matches since 2007.

Results and fixtures

The tables below include matches from the past 12 months as well as any future scheduled matches.

2022

2023

Coaching staff

Coaching history

  Carlos Padilla (1960–1962)
  Elsy Núñez (1962–1966)
  Marinho Rodríguez (1966–1967)
  Sergio Fernández (1967–1968)
  Carlos Padilla (1968–1973)
  Peter Lange (1974–1976)
  José Herrera (1980–1986)
  Ger Blok (1987–1988)
  José Herrera (1988)
  Flavio Ortega (1991–1992)
  Estanislao Malinowski (1992–1993)
  Julio González (1993)
  Carlos Cruz (1995)
  Ernesto Rosa (1996)
  Ramón Maradiaga (1996)
  Miguel Company (1997–1998)
  Ramón Maradiaga (1998–2002)
  Edwin Pavón (2003)
  José Herrera (2003)
  René Simões (2003)
  Bora Milutinović (2003–2004)
  José Herrera (2005)
  Raúl Martínez (2006)
  Flavio Ortega (2006–2007)
  Reinaldo Rueda (2007–2010)
  Juan Castillo (2010–2011)
  Luis Suárez (2011–2014)
  Hernán Medford (2014)
  Jorge Pinto (2014–2017)
  Carlos Tábora (2018)
  Jorge Jimenez (2018–2019)
  Fabián Coito (2019–2021)
  Hernán Darío Gómez (2021–2022)
  Diego Vásquez (2022–)

Players

Current squad
The following 24 players were called up for the friendly against El Salvador and the Nations League match against Canada on 22 and 28 March 2023 respectively.

Caps and goals updated as of 30 October 2022 after the match against Saudi Arabia.

Recent call-ups
The following players have been called up to the Honduran squad in the last 12 months.

 PRE
 PRE
 PRE

 INJ

 PRE
 PRE
 PRE
 PRE

 PRE

 INJ Withdrew due to injury
 COV Withdrew due to COVID-19
 PRE Preliminary squad
 WD Withdrew for personal reasons

Records

Players in bold are still active with Honduras.

Most appearances

Top goalscorers

Competitive record

FIFA World Cup

CONCACAF Gold Cup

CONCACAF Nations League

Copa América

Since 1993, the South American Football Confederation (CONMEBOL) has invited non-CONMEBOL nations to Copa América tournaments.

Copa Centroamericana

CCCF Championship

Pan American Games

Central American and Caribbean Games

Central American Games

Head-to-head record
As of 30 October 2022 after the match against .

Honours
Major competitions

CONCACAF Championship / Gold Cup
 Champions (1): 1981
 Runners-up (2): 1985, 1991
 Third place (3): 1967, 2005, 2009
 Fair Play Award: 2005, 2007

CONCACAF Nations League
 Third place (1): 2019–20
Copa América
 Third place (1): 2001

Minor competitions

Copa Centroamericana
 Champions (4): 1993, 1995, 2011, 2017
 Runners-up (3): 1991, 2005, 2013
 Third place (2): 1999, 2009
CCCF Championship
 Runners-up (1): 1953
 Third place (4): 1955, 1957, 1960, 1961
Central American and Caribbean Games
 Third place (2): 1930, 1950
Lunar New Year Cup
 Champions (1): 2002

FIFA World Ranking

Last update was on 24 February 2022
Source:

 Best Ranking   Worst Ranking   Best Mover   Worst Mover

See also
Football in Honduras
Honduras national under-23 football team
Honduras national under-20 football team
Honduras national under-17 football team
Clásico centroamericano

References

External links

Official website 
Honduras FIFA profile
Matches at World Football Elo
Honduras at the World Cups
Honduras Teams at World Cups
Honduras: Head-to-Head Records at World Cups
Honduras Players' Clubs
RSSSF List of Honduras Matches
RSSSF List of Honduras Record International Players

 
Football in Honduras
Central American national association football teams